Northwood Historic District is a national historic district located at Greencastle, Putnam County, Indiana.  The district encompasses 100 contributing buildings and 1 contributing site in a predominantly residential section of Greencastle.  The district developed between about 1920 and 1960 and includes notable examples of Colonial Revival, Bungalow / American Craftsman, and Ranch style architecture.

It was added to the National Register of Historic Places in 2011.

References

Historic districts on the National Register of Historic Places in Indiana
Colonial Revival architecture in Indiana
Bungalow architecture in Indiana
Historic districts in Putnam County, Indiana
National Register of Historic Places in Putnam County, Indiana